Alberto Martinez or Martínez may refer to:

 Alberto Martínez (footballer, born 1950) (1950–2009), Uruguayan football midfielder
 Alberto Martínez (footballer, born 1990), Argentine football midfielder
 Beto Acosta (Alberto Martín Acosta Martinez, born 1977), Uruguayan forward
 Berto (footballer) (Alberto Martínez Díaz, born 1962), Spanish football midfielder
 Alberto Martinez Piedra (1926–2021), professor of political economy
 Alberto B. Martinez, U.S. soldier acquitted of murder in the deaths of Phillip Esposito and Louis Allen